Paulette Tavormina (born 1949 in Rockville Centre, New York) is an American fine-art photographer who lives and works in New York City.  Tavormina is best known for her series, Natura Morta, which features photographic imagery inspired by 17th century Dutch, Spanish and Italian Old Master still life painters.

Career

Tavormina's interest in photography grew out of a 1980s request by a New York public relations firm to photograph a visiting celebrity.  She then took an introductory class at the International Center of Photography in New York. After moving to Santa Fe, New Mexico, Tavormina took a class in black and white photography and darkroom technique, and became a commercial photographer, specializing in historical Indian pottery and Navajo jewelry.  She also worked as a food stylist, collaborating on six cookbooks, including The Coyote Café Cookbook and The Red Sage Cookbook. She adapted her food styling experience to become a prop and food specialist for Hollywood films including The Astronaut's Wife, where part of her work involved creating elaborate food scenes. While in Santa Fe, Tavormina became fascinated by the work of Sarah McCarty, a Santa Fe-based still life painter and was introduced to the works of 17th century Old Master still-life painters Giovanna Garzoni and Maria Sibylla Merian.

Early in her career, Tavormina spent six years working at Sotheby's auction house in New York, surrounded by fine art. Returning to New York in the mid-2000s, after a period learning Italian and finding her ancestral roots in Sicily, Tavormina joined Sotheby's again, photographing works of art for their auction catalogues. Tavormina began experimenting and creating photographic images reminiscent of the still life art of Dutch, Italian and Spanish painters of the 17th century, including Francesco de Zurbarán, Giovanna Garzoni, Maria Sibylla Merian, and Willem Claesz Heda. By 2009, Tavormina had developed the lighting and composition style that forms the backbone of her Natura Morta series, and the work was shown publicly for the first time in 2009 at Sotheby's. Her first gallery show was the Still Seen group exhibition at Robert Klein Gallery in Boston in the fall of 2009. Tavormina's work has since been part of a number of solo and group exhibitions.  In addition to her fine-art photography, Tavormina photographs images for cookbooks such as The 1802 Beekman Heirloom Cookbook and The 1802 Beekman Heirloom Dessert Cookbook and other commercial publications such as Sotheby's at Auction, Martha Stewart Weddings, The New York Times, and National Geographic magazine.

Monograph
A monograph entitled Paulette Tavormina: Seizing Beauty was published in 2016 by The Monacelli Press.  This 160-page volume incorporates plates of Tavormina's major works from the period 2008 to 2015 as well as essays by the art and photography scholars Silvia Malaguzzi, Mark Alice Durant and Anke Van Wagenberg-Ter Hoeven.

Awards and grants
In August 2016, Tavormina was selected by the Pollock-Krasner Foundation as a 2016 recipient of a Pollock-Krasner grant.

In November 2010, Tavormina was awarded the Grand Prix of the Festival International de la Photographie Culinaire, a juried photography competition held annually in Paris, France.

Solo museum exhibitions
Snite Museum of Art, University of Notre Dame, South Bend, IN, August 21, 2016 - November 27, 2016 
Academy Art Museum, Easton, MD, April 23, 2016 - July 10, 2016

Solo gallery exhibitions
A Concert of Birds, Robert Mann Gallery, New York, NY, 2018
Seizing Beauty, Colnaghi, Madrid, Spain, 2018
Seizing Beauty, Colnaghi, London, England, 2017 
Paulette Tavormina, Beetles + Huxley Gallery, London, England, 2015 
Paulette Tavormina: Bogedón, Robert Mann Gallery, New York, 2015 
Bogedón Series by Paulette Tavormina, March SF, San Francisco, 2014 
Black & Bloom, A solo exhibition in two parts, Robert Klein Gallery, Boston MA, 2014 
Photographs, March SF, San Francisco, 2013 
Natura Morta, Robert Mann Gallery, New York, 2013 
Natura Morta, Polka Gallery, Paris, 2012 
Natura Morta, Robert Klein Gallery, Boston, 2010

Selected group exhibitions
Undying Traditions: Momento Mori, Muskegon Museum of Art, Muskegon, MI, 2020.
The Garzoni Challenge, Uffizi Galleries, Florence, Italy, 2020.
Seizing Beauty, Colnaghi Gallery, New York, NY, 2020.
Garden Party, Catherine Couturier Gallery, Houston, TX, 2019.
Sleep with the Fishes, Robert Mann Gallery, New York, NY, 2019.
Birds of a Feather, Robert Mann Gallery, New York, NY, 2017.
Still Life – The Pleasure of Stopping Time, Holden Luntz Gallery, Palm Beach, Florida, 2016. 
Month of Photography Denver: Playing with Beauty curated by Mark Sink, RedLine, Denver, Colorado, 2015  
Summer Photography Show,  Stephanie Hoppen Gallery, London, England, 2014 
Fragile,  Chris Beetles Fine Photographs, London, England, 2013 
An Artist's Delight: Revealing the Fantasies of Still Life, Alimentarium Museum, Vevey, Switzerland, 2014 
The Photographers 2011, Chris Beetles Fine Photographs, London, United Kingdom, 2011 
Natura Morta, Polka Gallery, Paris, 2011 
Natura Morta, Pobeda Gallery, Moscow, Russia, 2011
Still Life Revisited, Everson Museum of Art, Syracuse, New York, 2011 
Food for Thought, Robert Mann Gallery, New York, New York, 2011 
Naturae Mortae: Master Photographers of the 20th Century, Photographica Fine Art, Lugano, Switzerland, 2010 
Through a Painter's Lens, Holden Luntz Gallery, Palm Beach Florida, 2009 
Still Seen, Robert Klein Gallery, Boston, MA, 2009,

References

External links

Robert Klein Gallery
Photography Now

American women photographers
1949 births
Living people
Photographers from New York (state)
People from Rockville Centre, New York
Fine art photographers
21st-century American women